African Safety Promotion: A Journal of Injury and Violence Prevention is a forum for discussion and debate among scholars, policy-makers and practitioners active in the field of injury prevention and safety promotion.

External links 
 
 Journal page at African Journals Online

Publications established in 2002
Open access journals
Occupational safety and health journals
2002 establishments in South Africa
Biannual journals